Cala Homes is a British housebuilding company headquartered in Edinburgh, Scotland.

History
Cala Homes (Gaelic Dachaighean Cala) was founded in 1875 as the City of Aberdeen Land Association. It has grown to become one of the UK's largest house builders. Between 1999 and 2013 the Bank of Scotland held a majority stake in the company, until Legal & General and Patron Capital each took a 46.5% stake in the company in March 2013. In 2014, it bought rival Banner Homes for £200 million. Legal & General acquired full control of Cala Homes in March 2018.

Kevin Whitaker is the group chief executive. He was previously one of two regional chairs, and managing director of the Cala Homes East division.

References

External links
CALA Homes official website

Housebuilding companies of the United Kingdom
Real estate companies established in 1875
Construction and civil engineering companies established in 1875